Freya Castle is a  summit located in the Grand Canyon, in Coconino County of northern Arizona, US. It is situated one mile southeast of the Cape Royal overlook on the canyon's North Rim, 1.5 mile north of Vishnu Temple, and 1.7 mile northeast of Wotans Throne.

Freya Castle is named for Freya, the Norse goddess of love, beauty, fertility, sex, war, gold, and seiðr. This name was applied by geologist François E. Matthes, in keeping with Clarence Dutton's practice of naming geographical features in the Grand Canyon after mythological deities. This geographical feature's name was officially adopted in 1906 by the U.S. Board on Geographic Names.

The first ascent of the summit was made by Harvey Butchart and Allyn Cureton on June 24, 1962. According to the Köppen climate classification system, Freya Castle is located in a Cold semi-arid climate zone.

Geology

The summit of Freya Castle is composed of cream-colored Permian Coconino Sandstone. The sandstone, which is the third-youngest of the strata in the Grand Canyon, was deposited 265 million years ago as sand dunes. Below the Coconino Sandstone is soft, slope-forming, Permian Hermit Shale, which in turn overlays the Permian-Pennsylvanian- Supai Group. Further down are strata of Mississippian Redwall Limestone, Cambrian Tonto Group, and finally Proterozoic Unkar Group at creek level. Precipitation runoff from Freya Castle drains south into the Colorado River via Vishnu Creek on its west side, and Unkar Creek on the east side.

Gallery

See also
 Geology of the Grand Canyon area
 Cape Royal

References

External links 

 Weather forecast: National Weather Service

Grand Canyon
Landforms of Coconino County, Arizona
Mountains of Arizona
Mountains of Coconino County, Arizona
North American 2000 m summits
Colorado Plateau
Grand Canyon National Park